Keijo Kurttila (born 8 April 1975) is a Finnish cross-country skier. He competed at the 2002 Winter Olympics, and the 2006 Winter Olympics.

Cross-country skiing results
All results are sourced from the International Ski Federation (FIS).

Olympic Games

World Championships

World Cup

Season standings

Individual podiums
 4 podiums – (4 )

References

External links
 

1975 births
Living people
Finnish male cross-country skiers
Olympic cross-country skiers of Finland
Cross-country skiers at the 2002 Winter Olympics
Cross-country skiers at the 2006 Winter Olympics
People from Utajärvi
Sportspeople from North Ostrobothnia
21st-century Finnish people